Zhejiang Jiangshan High School (ZJHS, JSZX, "Zhejiang Provincial Jiangshan Middle School") is a secondary school located in Jiangshan, Quzhou, Zhejiang, China.

Its origins are in a government-operated academy of classical learning established in the year 1737, during the second year of the rule of the Qianlong Emperor of the Qing Dynasty. The current Jiangshan High School was founded in 1938. The Jiangshan Foreign Language School is affiliated with Jiangshan High School.

On July 6, 2013, 29 students and 5 teachers from Jiangshan High School were on board Asiana Airlines Flight 214, traveling to a summer camp at West Valley Christian School in Los Angeles, when the aircraft crashed at San Francisco International Airport. Three Jiangshan students died in the crash.

References

Further reading
 "亚空难追踪 叶梦圆 王琳佳 刘易�今天回家了." (Archive) Zhejiang News (浙江新闻). July 29, 2013.

External links

  Jiangshan High School
 Jiangshan High School (Archive)

High schools in Zhejiang
Jiangshan
1938 establishments in China
Educational institutions established in 1938